Omiodes basalticalis is a moth in the family Crambidae. It was described by Julius Lederer in 1863. It is found in Australia, Papua New Guinea and Ambon Island and Aru in Indonesia.

References

Moths described in 1863
basalticalis